Navneet Kaur Dhillon is an Indian actress and model, who represented India at Miss World 2013. She was the winner of Pond's 50th edition of Femina Miss World India 2013 that was held in Mumbai on 24 March 2013. She won the Miss Multimedia award during Miss World 2013 beauty pageant,. She finished in top 20.

Early life
Her father is an Army officer. Education in initial years was at Army Public School, Ambala Cantt, and she finally settled in Patiala and finished her secondary education from Budha Dal Public School, Patiala. She then chose B tech. in TV and Media from Punjabi University, Patiala. Along with modelling, she also has interest in photography, swimming, horse-riding. She is a media student in Punjabi University, Patiala.

Pond's Femina Miss India 2013
She was crowned as the Femina Miss India World 2013 on 24 March 2013. Navneet was also crowned Femina Miss Timeless Beauty. She faced with a question of what her one regret would be if she were to die the following day, to which she replied as "The only thing I would regret would be not having done as much for society as I would like to. Issues of women's empowerment and child labour and other social evils are a big concern."

Pond’s Femina Miss India Chandigarh 2013
She was adjusted winner amongst the 11 finalists in the last round of Pond's Femina Miss India Chandigarh 2013. Navneet was also crowned Pond's Femina Miss Glowing Skin.

I AM She 2012
She was amongst the finalist of I AM She 2012 as contestant No. 6, although she didn't place in the contest but her grooming worked for Femina Miss India 2013.

Career
In an interview with PTI, she said that she is interested in Bollywood and if given an opportunity, she would definitely work hard. She was busy with the Femina Miss India 2013 tour and photo sessions at different locations of India and abroad. She is currently the brand ambassador for Pond's White Beauty BB+ Fairness cream.

Filmography

See also
 Femina Miss India
 Femina Miss World India 2013
 Miss Diva 2013

References

External links

 Miss India - Profile
 
 
 

Living people
People from Ambala
Female models from Haryana
Indian beauty pageant winners
Miss World 2013 delegates
Femina Miss India winners
1992 births
Punjabi people
Indian film actresses
Actresses from Haryana
Actresses in Hindi cinema
Actresses in Punjabi cinema
Punjabi University alumni
21st-century Indian actresses